Acta Biomaterialia is a monthly peer-reviewed scientific journal published by Elsevier. It is published on behalf of Acta Materialia, Inc., and is sponsored by ASM International and The Minerals, Metals & Materials Society. The journal was established in January 2005. The editor-in-chief is W.R. Wagner (University of Pittsburgh). The journal covers research in biomaterials science, including the interrelationship of biomaterial structure and function from macroscale to nanoscale. Topical coverage includes biomedical and biocompatible materials.

Formats of publication include original research reports, review papers, and rapid communications ("letters").

Abstracting and indexing
Acta Biomaterialia is abstracted and indexed in:
 Chemical Abstracts Service
 EMBASE
 EMBiology
 Elsevier BIOBASE
 MEDLINE/PubMed
 Materials Science Citation Index
 Science Citation Index Expanded
 Scopus
According to the Journal Citation Reports, the journal has a 2021 impact factor of 10.633.

References

External links 

Biochemistry journals
Elsevier academic journals
Materials science journals
Monthly journals
Publications established in 2005
Biotechnology journals
English-language journals
Academic journals associated with learned and professional societies